Dmitry Pankov (born 23 June 1968) is a Uzbekistani butterfly and freestyle swimmer. He competed in two events at the 1996 Summer Olympics.

References

External links
 

1968 births
Living people
Uzbekistani male butterfly swimmers
Uzbekistani male freestyle swimmers
Olympic swimmers of Uzbekistan
Swimmers at the 1996 Summer Olympics
Place of birth missing (living people)
20th-century Uzbekistani people